Gary Berntson (born 1945) is an emeritus professor at Ohio State University with appointments in the departments of psychology, psychiatry and pediatrics. He is an expert in psychophysiology, neuroscience, biological psychology, and with his colleague John Cacioppo, a founding father of social neuroscience.  
His research attempts to elucidate the functional organization of brain mechanisms underlying behavioral and affective processes, with a special emphasis on social cognition.

Background
Berntson studied biology and psychology at the University of Minnesota, and was awarded a Ph.D. (psychobiology and life sciences) in 1971. He then worked as a post-doc fellow with Neal Miller at Rockefeller University in the department of psychology between 1971 and 1973. Since 1973, Berntson is on the faculty at the Ohio State University.

Awards and Professional Activities
Berntson is a past president of the Society for Psychophysiological Science, and is currently a fellow of that organization. He received the “Paul D MacLean Award for Outstanding Neuroscience Research in Psychosomatic Medicine” from the American Psychosomatic Society (2013);
and the "Society for Psychophysiological Research Award for Distinguished Contributions to Psychophysiology" (2020). He has served as a Special Government Employee (SGE) Defense Science Board- Task Force on Predicting Violent Behavior (2010-2012). has been a member of the National Academy of Sciences Decadal Committee on Social & Behavioral Sciences & National Security (2017-2020) and a member of the NIH blueprint committee on interoception (2019-2020).

Research interests
The broad interest of Berntson's program is in the elucidation of the functional organization of brain mechanisms underlying behavioral and affective processes, with a special emphasis on social neuroscience. The program is guided conceptually by a recognition of the importance of multiple levels of analyzes in a meaningful understanding of complex neurobehavioral relations, and the strategic approach is collaborative and multidisciplinary in nature.  This is illustrated by current research on anxiety and autonomic control, which ranges from basic animal studies of central neural and neuropharmacological mechanisms, to human research that examines the links between psychological processes and autonomic as well as immune functions. Central to this program of research is an effort to understand, at a theoretical level, the organizational principles that characterize psychobiological relations. Recent collaborative research includes: a) the role of cognitive and social factors in autonomic regulation and immune functions, b) contribution of cortical/cognitive processes to anxiety, and the neural systems that mediate these relations, c) the impact of autonomic states on higher neural systems, d) the integrative organization of neurobehavioral, neuroendocrine, autonomic and immune systems, and e) psychoneuroimmunology and the social neuroscience of health and disease.

Selected books
 Berntson, G.G. & Cacioppo, J.T. (2009). Handbook of Neuroscience for the Behavioral Sciences. Wiley.  .
 Cacioppo, J.T., Tassinary, L.G., & Berntson, G. G. (2017). Handbook of Psychophysiology. Cambridge University Press.
 Cacioppo, J.T., Berntson, G.G., & Adolphs, R. (2002). Foundations in Social Neuroscience. MIT Press.
 Cacioppo, John; Berntson, Gary (2005-01-27). Social Neuroscience: Key Readings (Key Readings in Social Psychology). Psychology Press Ltd. .

Selected recent articles
 Berntson, G. G. & Norman, G. (2021). Multilevel analysis: Integrating multiple levels of neurobehavioral systems. Social Neuroscience.16(1):18-25. doi:  10.1080/17470919.2021.1874513. PMID 33442999
 Berntson, G. G. & Khalsa, S. S. (2021). Neural Circuits of Interoception. (Special section on Interoception; ed. Wen, C.) Trends in Neurosciences. 44: 17–28. PMID 33378653 DOI: 10.1016/j.tins.2020.09.011
 Berntson, G. G., Gianaros, P. J. & Tsakiris, M. (2019). Interoception. In Tsakiris, M. & Priester, H. (eds.). The interoceptive basis of the mind. (pp. 3–26). Oxford, England. Oxford University Press.
 Berntson, G. G. (2019). Presidential Address 2011. Autonomic modes of control and Health. Psychophysiology, 56(1):e13306. (pp 1–10). doi: 10.1111/psyp.13306. 
 Nederend, I., ten Harkel, A.D.J, Blom, N., Berntson, G. & de Geus, E.J.C. (2017). Impedance cardiography in healthy children and children with congenital heart disease: improving stroke volume assessment. International Journal of Psychophysiology, 120, 136–147.
 de Geus, E. J. C., Gianaros, P. J., Brindle, R. C., Jennings, J. R. & Berntson, G. G. (2017). Should heart rate variability be “corrected” for heart rate? Biological,quantitative, and interpretive considerations. Psychophysiology. 56(2):e13287. (pp. 1–26). doi: 10.1111/psyp.13287. 
 Norman, G.J. Necka, E.A. Berntson, G.J., (2016). Psychophysiological measures of emotion. In Meiselman, H. (ed.). Emotion Measurement. (pp 83–98) Sawston, UK: Woodhead Publishing.
 Norman, G. J., Berntson, G. G. & Cacioppo, J. T. (2014). Emotion, Somatovisceral Afference and Autonomic Regulation. Emotion Review, 6, 113–123.
 Krzywickia, A. T., Berntson, G. G., & O’Kane, B. L. (2014). A Non-Contact Technique for Measuring Eccrine Sweat Gland Activity Using Passive Thermal Imaging. International Journal of Psychophysiology, 94,25-34.
 Cacioppo, J.T., Berntson, G.G. (2005). "Analysis of the social brain through the lens of human brain imaging." In Cacioppo, J. T. & Berntson, G. G. (eds.) Social Neuroscience (pp. 1–17). New York: Psychology Press.
 Bosch, J.A., Berntson, G.G., Cacioppo, J.T., & Marucha, P.T. (2005). "Differential mobilization of functionally distinct Natural Killer subsets during acute psychological stress." Psychosomatic Medicine, 67, 366–375.
 Berntson, G.G., & Cacioppo, J.T. (2005). "Multilevel analysis: Physiological and biochemical measures." In Eid, M. & Diener, E. (Eds.), Handbook of multimethod measurement in psychology. (pp. 157–172). Washington, DC: American Psychological Association.
 Berntson, G.G. & Cacioppo, J.T. (2006). "Reasoning about brains." In Cacioppo, J.T., Visser, P.S., & Picket, C.L. (Eds.) Social neuroscience: People thinking about thinking people. (pp 1–11). Cambrdige, MA: MIT Press.
 Cacioppo J.T. & Berntson, G.G. (2006). "A bridge linking social psychology and the neurosciences." In Lange, P.M.V. (Ed.) Bridging social psychology. (pp 91–96). Cambridge, Mass: MIT Press.
 Berntson, G.G., Bechara, A., Damasio, H., Tranel, D., & Cacioppo, J. T. (2007). "Amygdala contributions to selective dimensions of emotion." Cognitive & Affective Neuroscience, 2, 123–129.
 Berntson, G.G., Norman, G.J., Hawkley, L.C. & Cacioppo, J.T. (2008). "Cardiac Autonomic Balance vs. Cardiac Regulatory Capacity."Psychophysiology, 45, 643–652.

See also
 Anxiety
 Affective neuroscience
 Autonomic nervous system
 Immunology
 Biological psychology
 Neuroscience
 Social neuroscience

References

External links
 Gary Berntson Lab 
 Ohio State University 

Ohio State University faculty
Living people
University of Minnesota alumni
21st-century American psychologists
1945 births
American neuroscientists
20th-century American psychologists